Nirmal Kanti Chatterjee (born 1 March 1925) is an Indian politician. He was elected to the Lok Sabha, lower house of the Parliament of India from Dum Dum as a member of the Communist Party of India (Marxist). Chatterjee was noted in March 2015 as being one of two surviving founders of the Jatiya Sangha prize.

References

External links
 Official biographical sketch in Parliament of India website

1925 births
Living people
People from West Bengal
India MPs 1989–1991
India MPs 1991–1996
India MPs 1996–1997
Lok Sabha members from West Bengal
People from North 24 Parganas district
Rajya Sabha members from West Bengal
Communist Party of India (Marxist) politicians